Alan Adler (born 23 May 1964) is a Brazilian sailor. He competed in the 1984, 1988, and 1992 Summer Olympics.

He won a gold medal in the yacht laser event at the 1989 Maccabiah Games in Israel.

References

External links
 
 
 

Living people
1964 births
Brazilian male sailors (sport)
Olympic sailors of Brazil
Sailors at the 1984 Summer Olympics – Flying Dutchman
Sailors at the 1988 Summer Olympics – Flying Dutchman
Sailors at the 1992 Summer Olympics – Flying Dutchman
Maccabiah Games gold medalists
Maccabiah Games medalists
Competitors at the 1989 Maccabiah Games
South American Champions Soling
Sportspeople from Rio de Janeiro (city)